The Monolith Tour was a concert tour by American rock band Thirty Seconds to Mars. Staged in support of the band's fifth studio album America (2018), the tour visited arenas and stadiums throughout 2018 and 2019. It was initially announced in October 2017 with European dates being released at the same time, with North American dates announced afterwards. It began on March 12, 2018 in Basel, Switzerland, and concluded on August 17, 2019 in Großpösna, Germany. The support acts for the tour included Walk the Moon, K.Flay, MisterWives, Joywave, and Welshly Arms.

The tour was promoted by Live Nation and sponsored in-part by AT&T. Due to the large demand and tickets selling out in minutes in multiple locations, extra tour dates were added to the itinerary.

Background
Thirty Seconds to Mars officially announced the tour on October 6, 2017, shortly after releasing the song "Walk on Water" as the lead single from their fifth studio album. The band debuted live the song at the 2017 MTV Video Music Awards, during a performance which was described as groundbreaking since it became the first live broadcasting shown through innovative infrared technology. The announcement came after the band concluded a promotional tour with Muse and PVRIS, which was one of the highest-grossing North American tour of 2017, according to Pollstar's annual year end tour chart. On February 8, 2018, tour dates were revealed for North America in two legs. Frontman Jared Leto made the announcement on The Ellen DeGeneres Show, giving members of the audience a ticket to an upcoming show. In addition, it was announced that the band's fifth studio album America will be released on April 6, 2018. Walk the Moon, K.Flay, MisterWives, Joywave, and Welshly Arms were confirmed as the supporting acts on select dates.

Development
Initially, twenty-nine shows were scheduled in Europe beginning in March 2018. Pre-sale tickets for the tour were offered to the band's fan club members on October 11, 2017, before going on sale to the general public on October 13. Initial dates for the tour sold out, prompting Live Nation to extend the tour with additional dates. In February 2018, thirty shows were announced to take place across the United States and Canada, beginning in June 2018. For the North American dates, Thirty Seconds to Mars partnered with Citigroup and AT&T; the latter partly sponsored the tour, including the Camp Mars Music Festival held in Malibu, California, by the band. Tickets for North American dates went on sale to the general public on February 16 at Live Nation. Copies of the album are included along with the purchased tickets. Special privileges were provided to Citi bank card holders, who had the opportunity to utilize the pre-sale in multiple locations on February 13.

On March 16, 2018, it was announced that the lead guitarist of the band, Tomo Miličević, would be taking a break from touring due to personal matters. In June 2018, he officially announced his departure from the band.

Set list 
This set list is representative of the show at Saint Petersburg Sports and Concert Complex. It does not represent all dates throughout the tour

 "Monolith"
 "Up in the Air"
 "Kings and Queens"
 "Search and Destroy"
 "This is War"
 "Dangerous Night"
 "Do or Die"
 "Pyres of Varanasi"
 "The Kill"
 "Stay"
 "Hurricane"
 "Great Wide Open"
 "City of Angels"
 "Rescue Me"
 "Night of the Hunter"
 "Rider"
Encore
"Walk on Water"
"Closer to the Edge"

Tour dates

Notes

References

External links 
 Official tour website

2018 concert tours
2019 concert tours
Thirty Seconds to Mars concert tours